NINJA-IDE (from the recursive acronym: "Ninja-IDE Is Not Just Another IDE"), is a cross-platform integrated development environment (IDE) designed to build Python applications.

It provides tools to simplify Python software development and handles many kinds of situations thanks to its rich extensibility.

Features 
Some of the current features of the IDE are:
 Light weight IDE
 Common functions such as: file handling, find in files code locator, go to line, tabs, automatic indentation, editor zoom, etc.
 Multi-platform: Linux, Windows, FreeBSD.
 Syntax highlighting for a wide variety of languages. Even though it is intended to be mainly a Python IDE, it can also handle several other languages.
 Static and PEP 8 error highlighting.
 Show tips to help migrate code from Python2 to Python3.
 Embedded Python console.
 Project management, allowing to add, modify and delete files and folders to projects, creating automatically the "__init__.py" files inside each module, etc.
 Allows showing/hiding the panels of the interface in a very simple way to fit each programmer's preferences.
 Completely configurable UI.
 Allows using more than one editor at once.
 An extensible plug-in system, which creation the IDE supports.
 Session handling: remembers opened files and projects after closing the IDE.
 Code Auto-completion.
 Code Locator: Lets you jump to any code in your project with just a few keystrokes.

Versions names 
NINJA-IDE always takes its version name based on the name of a weapon.

Previous Versions:
 2.x: Shuriken
 1.x: Kunai

Some available plugins 
Many plugins are being developed, mostly with the help of the Community.
A complete list of Plugins can be found here:
 NINJA-IDE Plugins

See also 

 Comparison of integrated development environments for Python

References

External links 

 
 Python IDE Wiki
 Python IDE (PyAr)
 Linux Magazine: Do Python coding with NINJA-IDE
 NINJA-IDE a powerful IDE for developing Python Apps
 NINJA-IDE, el ide que me atrapo 
 NINJA-IDE, un IDE pensado para Python 

Free integrated development environments
Free integrated development environments for Python
Free software programmed in Python
Python (programming language) software